Alférez Armando Rodríguez Airport is a public use airport serving Las Lomitas, a town in the Formosa Province of Argentina.

In 2012, the Argentine Air Force installed a long range primary air surveillance radar (es) at the airport.

See also

Transport in Argentina
List of airports in Argentina

References

External links 
OpenStreetMap - Las Lomitas
SkyVector - Alferez Armando Rodriguez Airport

Airports in Formosa Province